Anne Allen or Ann Allen may refer to:

Anne Allen (married 1766), wife of Pennsylvania governor John Penn
Ann Taylor Allen (graduated 1965), professor of German history at the University of Louisville
Ann Savoy née Allen (born 1952), American musician, author and record producer
Ann Allen Shockley (born 1927), American journalist and author
Elizabeth Anne Allen (born 1969), American actress

See also
Allen (surname)